Profesionalen Futbolen Klub Botev, commonly referred to as Botev Plovdiv or simply Botev (within its associated city), is a Bulgarian professional football club based in Plovdiv, Bulgaria, that competes in the Bulgarian Parva Liga, the top flight of Bulgarian football. Founded on 11 March 1912, it is the country's oldest active football club.

Botev is named after the Bulgarian national hero Hristo Botev. The club plays its home games at Botev 1912 Football Complex, located in the neighbourhood of Komatevo, while its stadium is under reconstruction.

During its history, the club has won 2 Bulgarian championships, 3 Bulgarian Cups, 1 Bulgarian Supercup and 1 Balkans Cup. Botev has also reached the Cup Winners' Cup quarter-finals once. In addition, the club has been a runner-up in the domestic league twice and has reached the Bulgarian Cup final thirteen times. In the years before the Bulgarian championship was created, the team regularly participated in the local Plovdiv championship, claiming it six times.

History

Early years (1912–1944)
The club was founded on 11 March 1912 as Hristo Botyov - Futbolno druzhestvo (meaning "Hristo Botyov - Football Association") in Plovdiv by 22 students from Saint Augustine's French College and First Boys High School. The name was chosen in honor of the Bulgarian national hero Hristo Botev, as proposed by the club's host - Tenyo Rusev. The club's first management board also included Stoyan Puhtev, serving as chairman, Nenko Penelov as vice-chairman and Petar Delev as both a secretary and cashier. Interestingly, the Botev Plovdiv’s constituent assembly was held on Sunday, March 11, 1912 and received a juridical registration on the next day, Monday, March 12. Presently club fans celebrate the later date as a birthday. 

In 1920, some members of the association split and founded a new football club, named Rekord. However, this did not deter Botev from winning the first unofficial urban championship. On 30 August 1925, Botev lost 2–6 to Turkish side Fenerbahçe, in its first international match. The following year, the team led by the playing coach and captain – Nikola Shterev, won the Plovdiv Cup.

Botev won its first national title in 1929, defeating Levski Sofia 1–0 in the final, with Nikola Shterev scoring the winning goal. The club became the first from Plovdiv to win the Bulgarian Championship. Notable players from the period include Stancho Prodanov, Vangel Kaundzhiev and Mihail Kostov, who played for the national team. In the following two years as well as in 1937 and 1940, Botev won the urban championship.

1944–1960
The club's name has been changed for political reasons several times: Botev (1912–1946), DNV(1947–51), DNA (1952–57), SKNA (1957), Botev (1957–1968) and Trakia (1968–1989). In 1951, Botev Plovdiv joined the newly created Bulgarian A PFG. Despite being relegated in 1953 to the Bulgarian B PFG, in 1954 the club easily won promotion for the top division. 1956 was very successful for the team, which finished 3rd in the domestic league and qualified for the final of the Bulgarian Cup, where Botev faced Levski Sofia. The final match was lost by the canaries with 2–5.

In the next few years, the local municipality decided to build a new venue for the sports club. The construction for the sports complex, started on July 21, 1959, and was built in a period of two years. The new stadium was named Hristo Botev, in honor of the national hero. The sport venue was inaugurated with a friendly match between Botev and Steaua București, which was won by the canaries with 3–0 in front of 20,000 spectators.

Dinko Dermendzhiev era (1961–1980)

In 1961 Botev finished 3rd in the A PFG, for second time in the club's history. This championship also marked the first appearance of the club's most important player Dinko Dermendzhiev and the beginning of Botev's golden age. Dermendzhiev holds Botev's overall appearances record, playing in 447 matches for the club. Second is Viden Apostolov with 429 matches and third is Petar Zehtinski with 351. Botev's all-time leading scorer is also Dermendzhiev, who scored 194 goals at his period in the club. Kostadin Kostadinov is the Botev's second highest scorer with 106 goals and third is Atanas Pashev with 100 goals.

Under the leadership of Dinko Dermendzhiev, Botev won their first Bulgarian Cup in 1962, beating Dunav Rousse 3–0 at Vasil Levski National Stadium in Sofia on 12 August. In the 1962–63 season Botev reached the quarter-final of the Cup Winners' Cup by eliminating Steaua București and Shamrock Rovers before losing to Atlético Madrid 1–5 on aggregate. In the same season the team finished runners-up in A PFG with 40 points, only 3 less than the first, Spartak Plovdiv.

The club claimed its second national title in 1967. A few days later, political authorities merged two local clubs with Botev – Spartak and Akademik, creating Trakia. The "new" club, continued playing its games on Hristo Botev Stadium and kept its players, colours, history and fans. The reasoning behind the merger was creating a team which would gather the best players in the city and contend with Sofia-based teams. However, only two players from recent rivals Spartak had joined the team.

The championship team featured several notable players, such as Viden Apostolov, Georgi Popov and Rayko Stoynov, with Vasil Spasov as head coach. Botev represented Bulgaria in the 1967–68 European Champions Cup where they lost in the first round to Rapid București after 2–0 win in Plovdiv and 0–3 (a.e.t.) loss in Romania. A few years later, in 1981, the team became runners up of the Balkans Cup for the first time, playing against Yugoslavian Velež Mostar after two spectacular final matches to finish second

The Golden Team (1981–1990)
In 1981, the club's forward Georgi Slavkov won the club's highest individual achievement, the European Golden Shoe after finishing as Europe's top domestic scorer with 31 goals. The same year, the team won its second Bulgarian Cup, after a win against Pirin Blagoevgrad. This period was very successful for the club. Botev finished 3rd in the A PFG, in 1981, 1983, 1985, 1987, 1988 and 2nd in 1986. In this year the team finished with 41 points, only 2 less than the first, Beroe, in spite of the 8–1 win against Beroe in the direct match. Many of the club's most notable stars played around this time, such as Antim Pehlivanov, Dimitar Vichev, Atanas Pashev, Dimitar Mladenov, Zapryan Rakov, Blagoy Bangev and Petar Zehtinski were part of the rank and file of the notable Golden Team.

An important achievement of that period was the 1985 Cup Winners' Cup campaign, when Botev qualified for the second round of the tournament. The team secured a 2–0 victory against the German powerhouse Bayern Munich (with Klaus Augenthaler, Dieter Hoeneß, Søren Lerby, Lothar Matthäus and Jean-Marie Pfaff in their squad). On November 7, 1984, in front of more than 45,000 spectators at Plovdiv Stadium, Atanas Pashev and Kostadin Kostadinov scored for the win, but Botev were eliminated after losing 1–4 in the first-leg. Another memorable win is the 1–0 home victory over Barcelona in a Cup Winners' Cup first-leg in 1981. On 29 November 1989, after 22 years of playing under Trakia, the club restored its authentic name – Botev.

Brokers Era (1991–1999)
In 1992, the club was bought by a conglomerate of brokers led by Hristo Alexandrov and Hristo Danov. They brought in players with experience in Bulgarian football, such as Nasko Sirakov, Bozhidar Iskrenov, Kostadin Vidolov and Borislav Mihaylov. In this period, Botev signed the first foreign player in the club's history, the Hungarian Roberto Szabay. These big investments however did not bring any significant results and the club only reached third place in the A PFG in 1993, 1994 and 1995.

Hristolov takeover, financial implosion (1999–2010)
On 19 March 1999 Botev was acquired by Dimitar Hristolov. This day marked the beginning of difficult years for the club. In the 2000–01 season, the team was relegated to B PFG, after playing 47 years in the A PFG. Botev spent one season in the second division and quickly returned to the top flight, but in 2004 the club was relegated for the second time. From 2005 to 2009 the club played in the A PFG, but in the second part of the league table.

In September 2009, Botev Plovdiv set an unusual record after fielding seven Italian players in the 1–2 away loss against Litex Lovech, becoming the first A PFG club to feature that many foreigners from the same nationality.

On 24 February 2010, Botev Plovdiv were administratively relegated from A PFG due to financial difficulties. Botev's opponents were awarded 3–0 wins by default during the second half of the season.

2010–present

Following the financial collapse in 2010, Botev Plovdiv were relegated to the third level of Bulgarian football, the amateur V Group for the 2010–11 season. The club was completely rebuilt on an administrative level, several Bulgarian players with first league and international experience helped the team return to B Group, such as striker Atanas Kurdov, midfielder Todor Timonov, captain Nikolay Manchev, and goalkeeper Armen Ambartsumyan. The club went unbeaten and won their regional third league, and thus gained promotion to the second level of Bulgarian football.

A new coach was hired for the 2011–12 B Group season. Petar Houbchev, who had previous international experience both as a player and manager, succeeded Kostadin Vidolov. The lack of good results, however, saw Hubchev sacked from his position in October 2011. Botev Plovdiv then reached an agreement with a new head coach – Milen Radukanov, who didn't show good results either. Therefore, Kostadin Vidolov returned at the helm of the club and succeeded in gaining promotion to the first level of Bulgarian football, after a 2–0 win against Sportist Svoge in the play-offs.

In the 2012–13 A Group season, the club showed good performance and finished fourth. Botev Plovdiv was allowed to participate in the 2013–14 UEFA Europa League, taking the place of the then financially struggling CSKA Sofia, this marked the return of the team in Europe, after 18 years of absence. The club defeated the likes of Astana and Zrinjski Mostar, before being eliminated by Stuttgart in the third qualifying round. In 2013–14, Botev Plovdiv finished fourth once more and also reached the 2013–14 Bulgarian Cup final, where they lost 0–1 to Ludogorets Razgrad. The club faced the same opponents in the 2014 Bulgarian Supercup match, which was lost 1–3. On the European front, the team participated in 2014–15 UEFA Europa League, where they managed to eliminate Libertas, before losing to St. Pölten. The following seasons, the club frequently secured places in the middle of the table.

On 24 May 2017, Botev Plovdiv won their 3rd Bulgarian cup title in a 2–1 win against Ludogorets Razgrad, by doing so the club secured a spot in the 2017–18 UEFA Europa League, where they met Partizani Tirana and Beitar Jerusalem, before being knocked out by Marítimo in the third qualifying round. On 9 August 2017, the club won its first Bulgarian Supercup title, beating Ludogorets Razgrad 5–4 on penalties, following a 1–1 draw in regular time. In June 2021, the establishment of a reserve team, Botev Plovdiv II, was announced. In July 2021, the club was acquired by former Reading Football Club owner Anton Zingarevich.

Crest and colours
Botev Plovdiv's kit colours were adopted in August 1917, during a board meeting. The yellow colour represents the club's founders from Saint Augustine's Catholic College and Thrace's golden grain fields, while the black colour symbolises the black earth of the fertile soil as well as the Orthodoxy of the club's other founders from First Boys High School.

A following board meeting, held in September 1917, replaced the club's crest, which was an encircled Cyrillic letter "Б", an abbreviation for "Ботевъ", the club's full name. The new approved crest (used today) was a red circle, with a green rectangle situated centrally above, with the name of the club inscribed inside. Above the rectangle was a yellow and black striped shield, while the club's year of establishment was displayed underneath it.

The crests' white, green and red colours embody the tricolour of the Kingdom of Bulgaria. Simultaneously, they symbolise the blood of the heroes, the pureness of the souls, and Bulgaria's fertility. The shield is a symbol of the brave while the infinite circle suggests eternity.

Club motto
Botev Plovdiv's motto is Krasota, vyara i borba (meaning Beauty, faith and fight).

Kit history

Grounds

In 1959, the authorities allowed the construction of a new club stadium at the place of the old field in the neighborhood of Kamenitza. The first building works began on 21 July 1959. Two years later, Botev Plovdiv returned to The college. On May 14, 1961, the reconstructed stadium was inaugurated. The prime minister – Anton Yugov – attended the celebrations together with the deputy-minister of the defence Dobri Djurov and most of the communist leaders. The celebrations ended with a friendly match against FC Steaua București won by the yellow-blacks with 3:0.

For more than 30 years, no big repairs were done on the college. In 1993, during the presidency of Hristo Danov, some serious repairs were made. The visitors' changing room was moved to the eastern part of the stadium. A tunnel under the East and the North stand was built to connect the visitors' changing room with the field and the capacity of the stadium was reduced. In 1995 electric lighting was put in, but ironically it did not reach the standards of the Bulgarian Football Union.

In the years from 1926 to 1947, Botev played six international games on the ground – two wins, three losses and one draw. The matches were played against Admira Vienna (1:7), Kecskemét (3:2 and 2:4), Beşiktaş (0:0), Bohemians Prague (1:3) and the famous "Wonderteam" of Austria Vienna (sensational win with 5:4) respectively. The attendance record was set on February 27, 1963, during the quarter-final of the Cup Winner's Cup against Atlético Madrid (1:1) – 40,000 people. The record for the Bulgarian championship was set in 1966 against Levski Sofia(0:1) – 37,000 people, but because of the riots between the fans and the rush of fans on the field, Botev Plovdiv was forced to play its derbies at "The Big House" – the City Stadium.

Several times, the stadium was used for football matches from the city rivals from Lokomotiv Plovdiv. During the second half of the 1980/81 season, "The Smurfs" (Lokomotiv Plovdiv) played their home matches on The college (which was followed by a relegation in the second division) as well as one match in the 2003/04 season (when Lokomotiv won the A PFG for the first time). Spartak Plovdiv also used the stadium for several matches during the 1995/1996 season. The stadium has also hosted the Bulgarian Cup final in 2000, when Levski Sofia won the cup after 2:0 against Naftex Burgas.

In the summer of 2008, the stadium underwent renovations to meet the requirements of the Football Union, the Central Stand was renovated and the new visitors' changing room was built under it.

On March 26, 2012, began a major reconstruction of the stadium, starting with conceptual design by architect Georgi Savov and supported by the new owner of the team Tzvetan Vassilev. According to estimates construction will consume about 15 million euro, and the facility must be ready for operation by mid 2015 just in time to host matches at the 2015 UEFA European Under-17 Championship. The reconstruction will be carried out in two phases, the first starting from the end of March 2012 and will last four months. The first stage consists in the replacement of the field, which will have modern drainage system and heating system . The field will be measuring 68x105 meters. Second stage consists of the demolishing of the four old tribunes and building of new ones closer to the football field.

On home matchdays, Botev Plovdiv's players traditionally enter the pitch to the Blue Canary tune (by Marisa Fiordaliso and Carlo Buti) before the start of a game.

Supporters and rivalries
Botev Plovdiv has maintained a strong fan base over the years and in terms of the popularity is staged as the third most supported club in Bulgaria. There is no unique umbrella organization embracing all fans of the Plovdiv Canaries. The club's ultras are known as Bultras.

Botev's eternal rival is the neighbouring city club of Lokomotiv Plovdiv, and both form the local Plovdiv derby. The two teams are the most supported ones in the second largest city in Bulgaria – Plovdiv – and the matches between them are well known to the Bulgarian football community, and also considered to be one of the fiercest rivalries in the world. Botev is the country's oldest continuously existing team, whereas Lokomotiv grew popular fanbase in the 70s. Traditionally, Lokomotiv's team drew support from the lower working class of society, whereas Botev's fanbase consisted mainly of the middle and upper classes, although that no longer applies.

Botev's regional cross-city rival is Beroe Stara Zagora. The match between the two clubs was dubbed as the "Thracian Derby" over the years.

The club also has a strong rivalry with Levski Sofia and CSKA Sofia, as the three of which compete to be the most popular teams in the country.

Botev fans have friendly relations with Aris Thessaloniki fans. In January 2020 a group of Botev fan that attended a game between Aris and their rival PAOK Thessaloniki was attacked by PAOK fans. One Botev fan was killed by a car. Two individuals were arrested and charged with murder.

Players

Current squad

For recent transfers, see Transfers summer 2022 and Transfers winter 2022–23.

Out on loan

Foreign players
Up to twenty foreign nationals can be registered and given a squad number for the first team in the Bulgarian First League, however only five non-EU nationals can be used during a match day. Those non-EU nationals with European ancestry can claim citizenship from the nation their ancestors came from. If a player does not have European ancestry he can claim Bulgarian citizenship after playing in Bulgaria for 5 years.

Second-team squad

Retired numbers

8* – Todor Nedelev

12 – Dedicated to the club's supporters

* Retired until the player is actively playing and decides to return.

Honours

Domestic
 Bulgarian State Football Championship/A Group:
 Winners (2): 1929, 1966–67
 Runners-up (2): 1962–63, 1985–86
 Third place (14): 1930, 1937, 1943, 1956, 1960–61, 1980–81, 1982–83, 1984–85, 1986–87, 1987–88, 1992–93, 1993–94, 1994–95, 2021–22

 Bulgarian Cup:
 Winners (3): 1961–62, 1980–81, 2016–17
 Runners-up (10): 1947, 1956, 1962–63, 1963–64, 1983–84, 1990–91, 1992–93, 1994–95, 2013–14, 2018–19

 Bulgarian Supercup:
 Winners (1): 2017
 Runners-up (1): 2014

 Soviet Army Cup:
 Runners-up (1): 1990

European
 Balkans Cup:
 Winners (1): 1972
 Runners-up (1): 1980–81

 UEFA Cup Winners' Cup:
 Quarter-finalists: 1962–63

Summary

UEFA ranking

Past seasons

67 seasons in A Group
5 seasons in B Group
2 seasons in V Group

Club officials

Head coaches

Key
* Served as caretaker manager.

The table below is a list of the last ten Botev Plovdiv managers.

Chairmen

Records

Note: For a complete list of Botev Plovdiv players, see :Category:Botev Plovdiv players.

Player of the year

References

External links

 Official website
 Profile at UEFA
 Profile at FIFA

 
Football clubs in Bulgaria
Association football clubs established in 1912
Fan-owned football clubs
1912 establishments in Bulgaria